The legislative districts of Pampanga are the representations of the province of Pampanga and the highly urbanized city of Angeles in the various national legislatures of the Philippines. At present, the province and the city are represented in the House of Representatives of the Philippines by its four congressional districts.

History 
Pampanga was initially composed of one representative district, wherein it elected four representatives, at large, to the Malolos Congress in 1898. It was later divided into two representative districts in 1907 for the Philippine Assembly; it remained so until 1941. When seats for the upper house of the Philippine Legislature were elected from territory-based districts between 1916 and 1935, the province formed part of the third senatorial district which elected two out of the 24-member senate.

In the disruption caused by the Second World War, Pampanga was represented by two delegates in the National Assembly of the Japanese-sponsored Second Philippine Republic: one was the provincial governor (an ex officio member), while the other was elected through a citywide assembly of KALIBAPI members during the Japanese occupation of the Philippines. Upon the restoration of the Philippine Commonwealth in 1945, Pampanga's pre-war two-district representation was retained; this remained so until 1972. 

The province and the chartered city of Angeles were represented in the Interim Batasang Pambansa as part of Region III from 1978 to 1984, and together elected four representatives at-large to the Regular Batasang Pambansa from 1984 to 1986. Pampanga (with the highly urbanized city of Angeles) was redistricted into four congressional districts under the new  Constitution which took effect on February 7, 1987, and elected members to the restored House of Representatives starting that same year.

Current districts 
The province's current congressional delegation is composed of two members of PDP–Laban, one member of Lakas–CMD, and one member of the Nacionalista Party. Among the four incumbent representatives is former president of the Philippines, Gloria Macapagal Arroyo. All four representatives are part of the majority bloc in the 19th Congress.

At-large (defunct)

1943–1944

1984–1986

References 

Pampanga
Politics of Pampanga